William Yong-Chuan "Bill" Chen  is a Chinese politician and applied mathematician.

He received his doctorate from the Massachusetts Institute of Technology in 1991, under the direction of Gian-Carlo Rota.

Between 1991 and 1996, Chen was a research fellow at Los Alamos National Laboratory, working with James D. Louck.
In 1996 he returned to China, founding the Center for Combinatorics at Nankai University. He also founded the
Journal "Annals of Combinatorics" published by  Birkhäuser. He is on the editorial board of Advances in Applied Mathematics.

References

Massachusetts Institute of Technology School of Science alumni
Year of birth missing (living people)
Living people